Effedia - Sulla mia cattiva strada (Full title: Effedia - Sulla mia cattiva strada: Fabrizio De André racconta Fabrizio De André) is a 2008 compilation by Italian singer/songwriter Fabrizio De André. The compilation consists of two CDs with a selection of songs recorded between 1959 and 1998, and a DVD featuring a documentary about De André's life and works.

The word "Effedia" derives from the Italian pronunciation of the initials of De André's name (Fabrizio De André).

CD

DVD

The documentary features excerpts from all the songs included in the compilation, as well as interviews to De André and other people related to the artist and his music.

Featuring (in order of appearance)
Fabrizio De André
Georges Brassens
Enza Sampò
Mina
Franco Battiato
Mia Martini
Zucchero
Fernanda Pivano
Roberto Murolo
Luigi Tenco
Sergio Castellitto
Gabriele Salvatores
Wim Wenders
Fiorello
Vasco Rossi

References 

2008 albums
Fabrizio De André albums